Jezebel is the debut studio album by New Zealand musician, Jon Stevens. The album contained two number one singles and was released in February 1980. It peaked at number 7 on the New Zealand album chart and cemented Stevens’ position as New Zealand’s premier solo male artist of the time.

The album was released on iTunes in New Zealand in June 2014.

Track listing
Vinyl, cassette (SBP237419)

A1	"Jezebel" - 3:25
A2	"In a Stranger's Arms" - 4:05
A3	"Seeing You (For The First Time)" - 4:54
A4	"Wages Of Love" - 3:17
A5	"Montego Bay" - 2:48	
B1	"Don't Let Love Go"  (with Sharon O'Neill)  - 3:22
B2	"Jo"	- 3:48
B3	"Lady Blue" - 3:02
B4	"The Honeymoon Is Over" - 3:02
B5	"Lovin' Arms"	- 3:00
B6	"Ain't No Sunshine" - 2:47

Charts

Certifications

References

1980 debut albums
Jon Stevens albums
CBS Records albums